Kaakkaa Muttai Ramesh, also credited as Ramesh Thilaganathan and V. Ramesh, is an Indian child actor who works in Tamil-language films.

Career 
When casting for Kaaka Muttai (2015), director M. Manikandan picked Ramesh, hailing from the fishermen community, for a leading role in the film. He was spotted in Kasimedu playing in a slum near the beach, when he was photographed by Manikandan - who then later approached his parents. The film's storyline revolves around two slum children of Chennai, whose desire is to taste a pizza, with Ramesh and fellow newcomer Vignesh cast as brothers. The film opened to widespread critical acclaim praising the performances of the cast members, storyline, screenplay, direction and other major technical aspects. It was further considered one of the "25 Greatest Tamil Films of the Decade" by Film Companion; the same website ranked the actors Vignesh and Ramesh's and Aishwarya Rajesh's performance as two of the "100 Greatest Performances of the Decade". Kaaka Muttai won the National Award for Best Children's Film and Best Child Artist, for the actors Ramesh and Vignesh, at the 62nd National Film Awards.

Ramesh later went on to work with Vikram in his music video "Spirit of Chennai", Raghava Lawrence in Motta Shiva Ketta Shiva (2017) and Nayanthara in the drama, Aramm (2017). Despite the success of his first film, several of Ramesh's subsequent ventures were lower in profile. He also teamed up to star alongside Vignesh in films including the long-delayed Padaippalan (2022) and the unreleased Vendaikkai Katthirikkai. In 2020, he featured in Pizhai, which opened to negative reviews.

Filmography

Films 

Music video
Spirit of Chennai (2016)

References

External links 

Living people
Child actors in Tamil cinema
21st-century Indian male child actors
Year of birth missing (living people)
Best Child Artist National Film Award winners